

Princess of Piedmont

See also
List of Savoyard consorts
List of Sardinian consorts
List of Italian consorts

External links

 
Piedmont